These are the Oricon number one albums of 1992, per the Oricon Albums Chart.

Chart history

References

1992 record charts
Lists of number-one albums in Japan
1992 in Japanese music